A universal history is a work aiming at the presentation of a history of all of mankind as a whole, coherent unit. A universal chronicle or world chronicle typically traces history from the beginning of written information about the past up to the present. Therefore, any work classed as such purportedly attempts to embrace the events of all times and nations in so far as scientific treatment of them is possible.

Universal history in the Western tradition is commonly divided into three parts, viz. ancient, medieval, and modern time. The division on ancient and medieval periods is less sharp or absent in the Arabic and Asian historiographies. A synoptic view of universal history led some scholars, beginning with Karl Jaspers, to distinguish the Axial Age synchronous to "classical antiquity" of the Western tradition. Jaspers also proposed a more universal periodization—prehistory, history and planetary history. All distinguished earlier periods belong to the second period (history) which is a relatively brief transitory phase between two much longer periods.

Historiography

Rankean historical positivism
The roots of historiography in the 19th century are bound up with the concept that history written with a strong connection to the primary sources could be integrated with "the big picture", i.e. to a general, universal history. For example, Leopold von Ranke, probably the pre-eminent historian of the 19th century, founder of Rankean historical positivism, the classic mode of historiography that now stands against postmodernism, attempted to write a Universal History at the close of his career. The works of world historians Oswald Spengler and Arnold J. Toynbee are examples of attempts to integrate primary source-based history and Universal History. Spengler's work is more general; Toynbee created a theory that would allow the study of "civilizations" to proceed with integration of source-based history writing and Universal History writing. Both writers attempted to incorporate teleological theories into general presentations of the history. Toynbee found as the telos (goal) of universal history the emergence of a single World State.

Modernization theory
According to Francis Fukuyama, modernization theory is the "last significant Universal History" written in the 20th century. This theory draws on Marx, Weber, and Durkheim. Talcott Parsons's Societies. Evolutionary and Comparative Perspectives (1966) is a key statement of this view of world history.

Instances and description

Ancient examples

Hebrew Bible
A project of Universal history may be seen in the Hebrew Bible, 
which from the point of view of its redactors in the 5th century BC presents a history of humankind from creation to the Flood, 
and from there a history of the Israelites down to the present. The Seder Olam is a 2nd-century CE rabbinic interpretation of this chronology.

Greco-Roman historiography

In Greco-Roman antiquity, the first universal history was written by Ephorus (fl. 4th century BC).  This work has been lost, but its influence can be seen in the ambitions of Polybius (203–120 BC) and Diodorus (fl. 1st century BC) to give comprehensive accounts of their worlds. Herodotus' History is the earliest surviving member of the Greco-Roman world-historical tradition, although under some definitions of universal history it does not qualify as universal because it reflects no attempt to describe an overall direction of history or a principle or set of principles governing or underlying it.  Polybius was the first to attempt a universal history in this stricter sense of the term:

Metamorphoses by Ovid has been considered as a universal history because of its comprehensive chronology—from the creation of mankind to the death of Julius Caesar a year before the poet's birth. In Leipzig are preserved five fragments dating to the 2nd century AD and coming from a world chronicle. Its author is unknown, but was perhaps a Christian. Later, universal history provided an influential lens on the rise of Christianity in the Roman Empire in such works as Eusebius's Ecclesiastical History, Augustine's City of God, and Orosius' History Against the Pagans.

Chinese historiography
During the Han dynasty (202 BCE – 220 CE) of China, Sima Qian (145–86 BC) was the first Chinese historian to attempt a universal history—from the earliest mythological origins of his civilization to his present day—in his Records of the Grand Historian. Although his generation was the first in China to discover the existence of kingdoms in Central Asia and India, his work did not attempt to cover the history of these regions.

Medieval examples

Western Europe
The first Christian world chronicle was written in Greek around 221CE by Julius Africanus, who has been called "the undisputed father of the tradition". The Chronica of Eusebius of Caesarea (c. 275–339) contained in its second book an innovative set of concordance tables (Chronici canones) that for the first time synchronized the several concurrent chronologies in use with different peoples. Eusebius' chronicle became known to the Latin West through the translation by Jerome (c. 347–420). Jerome also wrote a chronicle of his own, and the early chronicles of Isidore of Seville (c. 560–636) and Bede were highly influential, especially Bede's work on chronology. Together, these laid the foundation for the Western universal chronicle tradition.

The medieval universal chronicle traces history from the beginning of the world up to the present and was an especially popular genre of historiography in medieval Western Europe. The universal chronicle differs from the ordinary chronicle in its much broader chronological and geographical scope, giving, in principle, a continuous linear account of the progress of world history from the creation of the world up to the author's own times, but in practice often narrowing down to a more limited geographical range as it approaches those times. They usually have a theological component and are often structured around the ideas of the six ages of the world or the four empires from the Book of Daniel. Less commonly they may use the Augustinian idea of the tension between the heavenly and the earthly state, as depicted in the City of God, which plays a major role in Otto von Freising's Historia de duabus civitatibus. Augustine's thesis depicts the history of the world as universal warfare between God and the Devil. A related idea is the division of history into popes and emperors, which became popular with the success of Martin of Troppau.

In other cases, any obvious theme may be lacking. Some universal chronicles bear a more or less encyclopedic character, with many digressions on non-historical subjects, as is the case with the Chronicon of Helinand of Froidmont. Other notable universal chroniclers of the Medieval West include the Chronicon universale usque ad annum 741, Christherre-Chronik, Helinand of Froidmont (c. 1160—after 1229),  Jans der Enikel, Matthew Paris (c. 1200–1259), Ranulf Higdon (c. 1280–1363), Rudolf von Ems, Sigebert of Gembloux (c. 1030–1112), Otto von Freising (c. 1114–1158), and Vincent of Beauvais (c. 1190–1264?). The tradition of universal history can even be seen in the works of medieval historians whose purpose may not have been to chronicle the ancient past, but nonetheless included it in a local history of more recent times.  One such example is the History of Gregory of Tours (d. 594), where only the first of his ten books describes creation and ancient history, while the last six books focus on events in his own lifetime and region.  While this reading of Gregory is currently a widely accepted hypothesis in historical circles, the central purpose of Gregory's writing is still a topic of hot debate.

Historiography of early Islam

In the medieval Islamic world (13th century), universal history in this vein was taken up by Muslim historians such as Tarikh-i Jahangushay-i Juvaini ("The History of The World Conqueror") by Ala'iddin Ata-Malik Juvayni, Jami al-Tawarikh ("Compendium of Chronicles") by Rashid-al-Din Hamadani (now held at the University of Edinburgh) and the Muqaddimah by Ibn Khaldun.

Modern historiography

An early European project was the Universal History of George Sale and others, written in the mid-18th century.

Christian writers as late as Bossuet in his Discours sur l'histoire universelle  (Speech of Universal History) are still reflecting on and continuing the Medieval tradition of universal history.<ref>Bossuet, J. B. Discours sur l'histoire universelle (Paris, Furne et cie, 1853).</ref>
Speech of Universal History is considered by many Catholics as an actual second edition or continuation of the City of God. In this work Bossuet continues to provide an update of universal history according to Augustine's thesis of universal war between those humans that follow God and those who follow the Devil. This concept of world history guided by Divine Providence in a universal war between God and Devil is part of the official doctrine of the Catholic Church as most recently stated in the Second Vatican Council' s Gaudium et Spes document: "The Church . . . holds that in her most benign Lord and Master can be found the key, the focal point and the goal of man, as well as of all human history...all of human life, whether individual or collective, shows itself to be a dramatic struggle between good and evil, between light and darkness...The Lord is the goal of human history the focal point of the longings of history and of civilization, the center of the human race, the joy of every heart and the answer to all its yearnings."

In the 19th century, universal histories proliferated.

Philosophers such as Kant, Herder, Schiller and Hegel, and political philosophers such as Marx and Herbert Spencer, presented general theories of history that shared essential characteristics with the Biblical account: they conceived of history as a coherent whole, governed by certain basic characteristics or immutable principles. Kant who was one of the earliest thinkers to use the term Universal History described its meaning in "Idea for a Universal History with a Cosmopolitan Purpose":

Universal chronicles

Ancient

Ancient history is the study of the past from the beginning of recorded human history to the Early Middle Ages. In India, the period includes the early period of the Middle Kingdoms,Smith, V. A. (1904). The early history of India from 600 B.C. to the Muhammadan conquest, including the invasion of Alexander the Great. Oxford: Clarendon Press. and, in China, the time up to the Qin dynasty is included.Gernet, J. (1996). A history of Chinese civilization. Cambridge: Cambridge University Press.

The Bronze Age forms part of the three-age system. In this system, it follows the Neolithic Age in some areas of the world. In the 24th century BC, the Akkadian EmpireWells, H. G. (1921). The outline of history, being a plain history of life and mankind New York: Macmillan company. Page 137. was founded. The First Intermediate Period of Egypt (c. 22nd century BC) was followed by the Middle Kingdom of Egypt between the 21st to 17th centuries BC. Around the 18th century BC, the Second Intermediate Period of Egypt began. By 1600 BC, Mycenaean Greece developed, the beginning of the Shang dynasty in China emerged and there was evidence of a fully developed Chinese writing system. Also around 1600 BC, the beginning of Hittite dominance of the Eastern Mediterranean region is seen. From the 16th to 11th centuries BC the New Kingdom of Egypt dominated the Nile Valley. Between 1550 BC and 1292 BC, the Amarna Period developed.

The Iron Age is the last principal period in the three-age system, preceded by the Bronze Age. Its date and context vary depending on the country or geographical region.
During the 13th to 12th centuries BC, the Ramesside Period occurred in Egypt. Around c. 1200 BC, the Trojan War was thought to have taken place. By c. 1180 BC, the disintegration of the Hittite Empire was underway.

In 1046 BC, the Zhou force, led by King Wu of Zhou, overthrows the last king of the Shang dynasty. The Zhou dynasty is established in China shortly thereafter. In 1000 BC, the Mannaeans Kingdom begins in Western Asia. Around the 10th to 7th centuries BC, the Neo-Assyrian Empire forms in Mesopotamia. In 800 BC, the rise of Greek city-states begins. In 776 BC, the first recorded Olympic Games are held.Dates are approximate, consult particular article for details Middle 

The post-classical era, also known as the Middle Ages, is a historical period following the Iron Age, fully underway by the 5th century and lasting to the 15th century, and preceding the early Modern Era.Emma Willard. A system of universal history, in perspective: accompanied by an atlas, exhibiting chronology in a picture of nations, and progressive geography in a series of maps. F. J. Huntington, 1835. Page 3 The medieval history is the middle period, or the middle age, in a three-period division of history: Classic, Medieval, and Modern. The precise dates of the beginning, culmination, and end of the medieval history are more or less arbitrarily assumed according to the point of view adopted. Any hard and fast line drawn to designate either the beginning or close of the period in question is arbitrary. The widest limits given, viz., the irruption of the Visigoths over the boundaries of the Roman Empire, for the beginning, and the Middle Ages of the 16th century, for the close, may be taken as inclusively sufficient, and embrace, beyond dispute, every movement or phase of history that can be claimed as properly belonging to the medieval history.

In Europe, the period saw the large-scale European Migration and fall of the Western Roman Empire. In South Asia, the middle kingdoms of India were the classical period of the region. The "Medieval" period on the Indian subcontinent lasts for some 1,500 years, and ends in the 13th century. During the late medieval history, several Islamic empires were established in the Indian subcontinent. In East Asia, the Mid-Imperial China age begins with the reunification of China and ends with China was conquered by the Mongol Empire. The Golden Horde invaded North and West Asia and parts of eastern Europe in the 13th century and established and maintained their khanate until the end of the medieval history.

The Early medieval history saw the continuation of trends set up in ancient history (and, for Europe, late Antiquity). The period is usually considered to open with those migrations of the German Tribes which led to the destruction of the Roman Empire in the West in 375, when the Huns fell upon the Gothic tribes north of the Black Sea and forced the Visigoths over the boundaries of the Roman Empire on the lower Danube. A later date, however, is sometimes assumed, viz., when Odoacer deposed Romulus Augustulus, the last of the Roman Emperors of the West, in 476.  Depopulation, deurbanization, and increased barbarian invasion were seen across the Old World. North Africa and the Middle East, once part of the Eastern Roman Empire, became Islamic. Later in European history, the establishment of the feudal system allowed a return to systemic agriculture. There was sustained urbanization in northern and western Europe.

During the High medieval history in Europe, Christian-oriented art and architecture flourished and Crusades were mounted to recapture the Holy Land from Muslim control. The influence of the emerging states in Europe was tempered by the ideal of an international Christendom. The codes of chivalry and courtly love set rules for proper European behavior, while the European Scholastic philosophers attempted to reconcile Christian faith and reason.

During the Late medieval history in Europe, the centuries of prosperity and growth came to a halt.
The close of the medieval history is also variously fixed; some make it coincide with the rise of Humanism and the Renaissance in Italy, in the 14th century; with the Fall of Constantinople, in 1453; with the discovery of America by Columbus in 1492; or, again, with the great religious schism of the 16th century. A series of famines and plagues, such as the medieval Great Famine and the Black Death, reduced the population around half before the calamities in the late medieval history. Along with depopulation came social unrest and endemic warfare. Western Europe experienced serious peasant risings: the Jacquerie, the Peasants' Revolt, and the Hundred Years' War. To add to the many problems of the period, the unity of the Catholic Church was shattered by the Western Schism. Collectively the events are a crisis of the Late medieval history.

Modern

Modern history describes the historical period after the Middle history.The Century Dictionary and Cyclopedia, Page 3814 Modern history can be further broken down into the early modern period and the late modern period after the French Revolution and the Industrial Revolution. Contemporary history describes the span of historic events that are immediately relevant to the present time. The Great Divergence refers to the period of time in which the process by which the Western Europe and the parts of the New World overcame pre-modern growth constraints and emerged during the 19th century as the powerful and wealthy world civilization of the time, eclipsing Qing China, Mughal India, Tokugawa Japan, and the Ottoman Empire.

The modern era began approximately in the 16th century. Many major events caused Europe to change around the start of the 16th century, starting with the Fall of Constantinople in 1453, the fall of Muslim Spain and the discovery of the Americas in 1492, and Martin Luther's Protestant Reformation in 1517. In England the modern period is often dated to the start of the Tudor period with the victory of Henry VII over Richard III at the Battle of Bosworth in 1485.Early Modern Period (1485–1800), Sites Organized by Period, Rutgers University Libraries Early modern European history is usually seen to span from around the start of the 15th century, through the Age of Reason and the Age of Enlightenment in the 17th and 18th centuries, until the beginning of the Industrial Revolution in the late 18th century.

 Early modern age 

The modern era includes the early period, called the early modern period, which lasted from c. 1500 to around c. 1800 (most often 1815). Particular facets of early modernity include:
 The Renaissance
 The Reformation and Counter Reformation.
 The Age of Discovery
 Rise of capitalism

The early period ended in a time of political and economic change as a result of mechanization in society, the American Revolution, the first French Revolution; other factors included the redrawing of the map of Europe by the Final Act of the Congress of Vienna and the peace established by Second Treaty of Paris which ended the Napoleonic Wars.

 Late modern age 

As a result of the Industrial Revolutions and the earlier political revolutions, the worldviews of Modernism emerged. The industrialization of many nations was initiated with the industrialization of Britain. Particular facets of the late modernity period include:
 Increasing role of science and technology
 Mass literacy and proliferation of mass media
 Spread of social movements
 Institution of representative democracy
 Individualism
 Industrialization
 Urbanization

Other important events in the development of the Late modern period include:
 The Revolutions of 1848
 The Russian Revolution
 The First World War and the Second World WarDates are approximate range (based upon influence), consult particular article for details  Modern Age  Other

Contemporary

The contemporary "Great Divergence" is a term given to a period starting in late 1970s when inequality grew substantially in the United States and to a lesser extent in other countries such as Canada and the United Kingdom. The term originated with Nobel laureate, Princeton economist and New York Times columnist Paul Krugman, and is a reference to the "Great Compression", an earlier era in the 1930s and 40s when income became dramatically more equal in the United States and elsewhere.

See also
Timelines

Main Macrohistory, Open and closed systems in social science, interconnectedness and holism, Causality and dynamical systems, Complex system
People David Christian, Jami' al-tawarikh, al-Tabari, John Clark Ridpath
Books Cyclopedia of Universal History, Idea for a Universal History with a Cosmopolitan Purpose, The End of History and the Last ManProjectsSeshat (project)
General World-systems theory, Metanarrative, Cliometrics, Big History, Systems theory, Interdependence, Hindu units of time
Other Comparative history, Historical materialism, Integral theory, Epic of evolution, Chaos theory (and Butterfly effects), Systems theory in political science, Source criticism, Primary research and Secondary research, Literature review

References

Literature Cited
 
 
 
 
 
 
 
  
 
 
 
 
 
 
 
 

Further reading
Pre-1920s books
 History, Its Theory and Practice – Benedetto Croce, Douglas Ainslie.
 Compendium of Chronicles. Rashīd al-Dīn Ṭabīb
 George Crabb. Universal Historical Dictionary. Baldwin and Cradock, 1833
 An universal history: in twenty-four books, Volume 1 By Johannes von Müller, James Cowles Prichard
Bonnaud, Robert, The System of History, Fayard 1989, 334 pages (not yet translated).
Guha, Ranajit, "History at the Limit of World-History" (Italian Academy Lectures), Columbia University Press 2002.
 Sale, George, Archibald Bower, and George Psalmanazar, "An Universal History, from the Earliest Account of Time". Millar, 1747.
 Wilson, Horace Hayman, "A manual of universal history and chronology". 1835.
Jones, Lynds Eugene, George Palmer Putnam, and Simeon Strunsky, "Tabular Views of Universal History". G. P. Putnam's sons, 1907. 313 pages.
 Fisher, George Park, "Outlines of Universal History". Ivison, Blakeman, Taylor, and company, 1885. 674 pages.
 Georg Weber, "Outlines of Universal History: From the Creation of the World to the Present Time". Hickling, Swan and Brewer, 1859. 559 pages. (ed. Translated by M. Behr).
 Ollier, Edmund, "Cassell's illustrated universal history" Cassell, Petter, Galpin & Co., 1885.
 Clare, Israel Smith, "Library of Universal History". R. S. Peale, J. A. Hill, 1897.
 Recent foreign history. R. S. Peale, J. A. Hill, 1897.
 Egypt's Place in Universal History: An Historical Investigation in Five Books – Christian Karl Josias Freiherr von Bunsen, Samuel Birch, Philo (of Byblos.). 
 A chronological table of universal history extending from the earliest times to the year 1892. Louis Heilprin.
 World history in a concise representation. Georg Weber – German 
 An Introduction to the Study of Universal History. John Stoddart
 Hegel, GWF. Philosophy of Right. TM Knox, tr. Oxford UP: New York, 1967. para. 341–360 (pp. 216–223). As a point of clarification, Hegel writes of World History, although this is somewhat identical to Universal History.
 Kant, Immanuel. “Idea for a Universal History from a Cosmopolitan Point of View.” In Philosophical Writings. Ernest Behler, ed. Lewis W Beck, tr. Continuum: New York, 1986. pp. 249–262.

Post-1920s books
 A Study of History by Arnold Toynbee.
 The Outline of History by Herbert Wells.
 The Philosophy of History by Karl Jaspers.
 Mink, Louis O. “Narrative Form as a Cognitive Instrument.” In Historical Understanding. Brian Fay, et al., eds. Cornell UP: Ithaca, 1987. pp. 182–203.
 White, Hayden. Metahistory: The Historical Imagination in Nineteenth-Century Europe. Johns Hopkins UP, 1975.
 D Christian. "The return of universal history." History and Theory 49.4 (2010): 6–27. DOI 10.1111/j.1468-2303.2010.00557.x
 George Park Fisher. Outlines of Universal History Designed as a Text Book and for Private Reading. Kessinger Publishing, Jun 1, 2004.
 The Rise of the West: A History of the Human Community. By William H. McNeill.
 The End of History and the Last Man'' by Francis Fukuyama.
Teaching & Researching Big History: Exploring a New Scholarly Field, International Big History Association, 2014.
Patents
 , Chart for Teaching Universal History, Nov 1, 1920.

Websites
 "List of Historical Works of Universal History". (Visual tour)
 "World History Atlas & Timelines since 3000 BC". (Geacron)

Articles which contain graphical timelines
Chronicles
Historiography
Intellectual history
Linear theories
Theories of history
World history

ca:Història universal
ru:Универсальная история